Slaughter was a Canadian death metal band.  They formed in Toronto, Ontario, Canada in 1984 playing thrash metal and briefly featured Chuck Schuldiner on guitar in 1986. Originally, they released two demos and two full albums. Slaughter was disbanded from 1989 to 1995 but returned in 1996 to record a cover of Celtic Frost's "Dethroned Emperor" for a tribute album called In Memory of Celtic Frost. In 2001, they re-released "Strappado" under the Nuclear Blast label.

Slaughter also released a compilation of demos and live tracks under the Nuclear Blast label called Not Dead Yet/Paranormal. The band has been inactive again since 2001. Slaughter are currently working on a new release featuring rare, demo, live and rehearsal material.

On October 2, 2008, singer Dave Hewson announced that drummer Brian Lourie had died of a heart attack. He issued this statement – "[I] just wanted to let everyone know that longtime drummer for SLAUGHTER and STRAPPADO, Brian Lourie, has died of a heart attack at the young age of 39. Brian was one of the best people I have ever met and was a huge part of SLAUGHTER joining in 1987–88 'till we disbanded in 1992. His sense of humor and love for life made him such a wonderful person who will be greatly missed. I will try to [release] more info as it comes. Love you, bro."

Discography

Albums
Strappado (1987) - Diabolic Force/Fringe Records
Fuck of Death (2004) - Hells Headbangers Records

Compilation albums
Not Dead Yet/Paranormal (2001) - Nuclear Blast
Tortured Souls (2007) - Marquee Records
Nocturnal Hell, Surrender or Die (2016) - Vic Records

EPs
Nocturnal Hell (1986) - Diabolic Force/Fringe Records
Nocturnal Hell (2019) - Urbain Grandier Records

Split albums
Back to the Crypt/Sadist (2004) - Horror Records (split with Nunslaughter)

Demos
Meatcleaver (1984)
Bloody Karnage (1984)
Surrender or Die (1985) - Diabolic Force/Fringe Records
Paranormal (1988)
The Dark - Demo IV (1988)
Not Dead Yet (1990) - Headache Records

Live demos
Live Karnage (1985)

Former members
Dave Hewson - vocals, guitar (1984–1992)
Ron Sumners - drums (1984–1986)
Terry Sadler - vocals, bass (1984–1989)
Chuck Schuldiner - guitars (1986)
Brian Lourie - drums (1986–1992)
Bobby Sadzak - guitars (1988)

References

External links
Official Slaughter website
[ Allmusic review]

Musical groups established in 1984
Musical groups from Toronto
Canadian death metal musical groups
Nuclear Blast artists
Canadian thrash metal musical groups
1984 establishments in Ontario